EN 166:2001 Personal Eye-Protection - Specifications is a European standard. It concerns the area of eye protection. It replaced EN 166:1995.

History

References

00166
Protective gear